The following is a list of people from Lyon County, Kansas.  Inclusion on the list should be reserved for notable people past and present who have resided in the county, either in cities or rural areas.

List of people from Lyon County, Kansas

Academics
 Frank A. Beach, ethologist, best known as co-author of the 1951 book Patterns of Sexual Behavior
 Carl Salser, former Dean of the College of Education at Oregon State University

Arts and communication
 Don Coldsmith, author of primarily Western fiction
 Melora Creager, formerly cellist and lead singer and chief composer of the trio Rasputina
 R. Lee Ermey, actor
 Thelma Hill, silent film star
 Evan Lindquist, artist, printmaker, and Artist Laureate of the State of Arkansas
 Keith Waldrop, author
 William Allen White, publisher
 William Lindsay White, publisher

Athletics

American football
See also List of Emporia State Hornets head football coaches
 Horace Botsford, college football coach 1901-1903
 Henry Brock, college football coach
 Harold Elliott, college football coach
 Jim Everett, NFL quarterback 
 Homer Woodson Hargiss, college football coach
 Lem Harkey, San Francisco 49ers
 Fred Honhart, college football coach
 Jerry Kill, college football coach
 John Lamb, first coach of the Emporia State Hornets football team
 Leon Lett, professional football player with the Dallas Cowboys
 Manny Matsakis, college football coach
 H. D. McChesney, college football coach
 Paul Samson, American football
 Owen Samuels, college football coach
 Bob Seaman, college football coach; became head coach after Wichita State University football team plane crash
 Norman Sterry, college football player
 Fran Welch, college football coach
 Dave Wiemers, college football coach
 Fred Williams, college football coach

Auto racing
 Clint Bowyer, NASCAR driver

Baseball
 Ross Grimsley, baseball player

Basketball
 Dean Smith, college basketball coach

Golf
 J. L. Lewis, professional golfer

Clergy
 Bob Mize, Bishop of Damaraland from 1960

Infamous
 Mark Essex, spree killer who killed 9 people, including 5 police officers, and wounded 13 others in New Orleans on December 31, 1972 and January 7, 1973

Military
 James Harbord, Lieutenant General in the United States Army
 Grant F. Timmerman, U.S. Marine posthumously awarded the Medal of Honor during World War II

Politicians
 Jim Barnett, politician
 Don Hill, politician
 Chad S. Johnson, principal gay and lesbian issues adviser to the Al Gore/Joe Lieberman 2000 campaign
 Jeff Longbine, politician
 Peggy Mast, Kansas politician
 Bob Price, politician from Texas
 Edward Herbert Rees, teacher and member of the United States House of Representatives
 Roy Wilford Riegle, Probate Judge, Senate Member, Masonic Society Grand Master
 Louise Porter, Kansas State Senator

Other
 Alvin M. Johnston, test pilot
 Maud Wagner, the first female tattoo artist in the U.S.

See also

 Lists of people from Kansas

References

Lyon County